Waitākere railway station is a disused station on the North Auckland Line located in the village of Waitākere, to the north-west of Auckland, New Zealand. It served as the western terminus of the Western Line of the Auckland suburban network until July 2015, when services were restricted to Swanson and Waitakere Station was closed.

It has a crossing loop, a turntable and a small station building, which is in a poor state of repair.

History 
The station opened on 18 July 1881, an original station on this section of the North Auckland Line, as Waitakerei, and changed to the current spelling in 1909. In 1972 the station building was replaced, the old building being relocated to MOTAT for preservation.

This station was a suburban terminus from the 1930s, despite low patronage. In 1980, after the daily service between Auckland and Helensville was withdrawn, it became the terminus for passenger trains and in railway terms the northernmost passenger station on the national rail network (geographically the former Auckland railway station was further north).

Off-peak Mondays to Fridays every second Western Line train from Britomart continued beyond Swanson to Waitakere until the station's closure in July 2015, when these services ceased with the electrification of the Western Line to Swanson. A bus shuttle service operates between Waitakere and Swanson for this non-electrified section.

Closure

Waitākere Station closed in 2015 as part of the Auckland railway electrification project. The Waitākere Tunnel between Waitākere and Swanson was too low for overhead electrification equipment to be installed, and the cost of enlarging the tunnel was deemed to be unjustifiable as Waitākere was one of the least used stations on the network. The station closed in July 2015 when the rest of the Western Line switched to being operated by the new AM Class electric trains, and the former rail service was replaced with a bus service between Waitakere and Swanson.

See also 
 List of Auckland railway stations

References 

Rail transport in Auckland
Defunct railway stations in New Zealand
Railway stations opened in 1881
Railway stations closed in 2015
Waitākere Ranges Local Board Area
1881 establishments in New Zealand
West Auckland, New Zealand